The BFA Senior League is the highest championship of football in Bahamas. Before 2008 it was played between the winners of the New Providence Football League, the Grand Bahama Football League. In 2008 the two leagues from two islands merged into one league.

Current clubs (2017/2018 season)
Breezes Eagles
Cavalier FC
Future Stars
Dynamos FP
Bears FC
United FC
Western Warriors SC
Baha Jrs
Renegades FC

Previous winners

New Providence / Grand Bahama Football League (1991–2007)

BFA Senior League (2008–present)

Performance by club

Top scorers

References

External links
FIFA Standings
Bahamas - List of Champions, RSSSF.com

 
1
Bahamas
1990 establishments in the Bahamas
Sports leagues established in 1990